Henryk Budzicz (born 11 June 1953, in Olsztyn) is a Polish sprint canoer who competed from the late 1970s. He won two gold medals at the 1977 ICF Canoe Sprint World Championships in Sofia, earning them in the K-4 500 m and K-4 1000 m events.

Budzicz also finished fifth in the K-4 1000 m event at the 1976 Summer Olympics in Montreal.

References

External links
 
 

1953 births
Canoeists at the 1976 Summer Olympics
Living people
Olympic canoeists of Poland
Polish male canoeists
Sportspeople from Olsztyn
ICF Canoe Sprint World Championships medalists in kayak
20th-century Polish people